Ioan Constantin Marcu (born 21 May 1963) is a retired Romanian football midfielder.

References

External links

1963 births
Living people
Romanian footballers
CSM Flacăra Moreni players
FC Dinamo București players
FC Brașov (1936) players
Hapoel Tzafririm Holon F.C. players
Hapoel Tel Aviv F.C. players
Maccabi Netanya F.C. players
FCM Târgoviște players
Association football midfielders
Liga I players
Israeli Premier League players
Romanian expatriate footballers
Expatriate footballers in Israel
Romanian expatriate sportspeople in Israel